The 1992–93 Essex Senior Football League season was the 22nd in the history of Essex Senior Football League a football competition in England.

League table

The league featured 15 clubs which competed in the league last season, along with two new clubs:
Great Wakering Rovers, joined from the Essex Intermediate League
Romford, new club formed after original club folded in 1978

League table

References

Essex Senior Football League seasons
1992–93 in English football leagues